These are the results of the Women's single sculls competition, one of six events for female competitors in Rowing at the 2004 Summer Olympics in Athens.

Heats
24 competitors raced in four heats on August 14.  The top boats in each heat advanced to the semifinals, and the remaining boats moved to the repechage.

SF denotes qualification to semifinal
R denotes qualification to repechage

Heat 1

Heat 2

Heat 3

Heat 4

Repechages
20 competitors raced in four repechages on August 17.  All Competitors advanced to the semi-final.

Repechage 1

Repechage 2

Repechage 3

Repechage 4

Semifinals

24 competitors raced in the semifinals on August 18, 2004. They were moved forward to finals A-D based on their time.

FA denotes qualification to Final A.
FB denotes qualification to Final B
FC denotes qualification to Final C.
FD denotes qualification to Final D.

Semifinal 1

Semifinal 2

Semifinal 3

Semifinal 4

Finals
All 24 competitors raced on 19 August 2004 in the Finals.

Final A

Final B

Final C

Final D

References

External links
Official Olympic Report

Women's Single Sculls
Women's Single Sculls
Women's events at the 2004 Summer Olympics